The Gollewar (Golla) (also known as Gaur, Gaura, Gowda or Gowda) is a caste found mostly in the states of Andhra Pradesh, Bihar, Karnataka, Maharashtra and Odisha in India. Like the Kuruba, Kuruva and Kuruma, they are predominantly sheep, goat and cattle herders.

Hassan ( 1920 ) writes that the Golla have synonyms like Gulla , Gullar , Gollewar , Gauvali and Dhangar.

See also
Golla (caste)

References

Indian castes